Saron was a sawmill town in Trinity County, Texas.  It was located on Texas highway 94 about 8 miles from Groveton.  Now a farming community, the estimated population is 5.

References

Unincorporated communities in Trinity County, Texas
Unincorporated communities in Texas